Valiabad (also Romanized as Valīābād) is a village in Valiabad Rural District, in the Central District of Qarchak County, Tehran Province, Iran. At the 2006 census, its population was 3,663, in 849 families.

References 

Populated places in Qarchak County